Aguadilla Spartans FC is a football team that plays in San Juan, Puerto Rico in the Liga Nacional de Futbol de Puerto Rico.

2008 season
Spartans FC finished with a record of 6-1-1.

Liga Nacional
Lost their first game 1-0 to Huracan FC.

Current squad

Accomplishments

Puerto Rico Soccer League
Excellence Cup
Champions: 2015

Year-by-year

References

Puerto Rico Soccer League 2nd Division
Liga Nacional de Fútbol de Puerto Rico teams